Hodgeville is a village in the Canadian province of Saskatchewan within the Rural Municipality of Lawtonia No. 135 and Census Division No. 7. The village is located approximately 34 km south of the Trans Canada Highway, 97 km southeast of the City of Swift Current.

History 
Hodgeville incorporated as a village on June 22, 1921.

Demographics 

Economy
Hodgeville's economic base is mainly agricultural and related services.

Education

Hodgeville School is located in the community. Prior to 2002, there were an elementary school and a high school. The elementary school underwent renovations and the high school moved into the elementary school building.

Notable people

The provincial Flag of Saskatchewan was originally created here, by a man named Anthony Drake, a school teacher from Hodgeville in 1969. The Heritage Museum displays the flag, a Western Red Lily on a green and gold field, alongside Anthony's story.

The author of the song "There's a Bluebird on my Windowsill" was Elizabeth (née Huber) Clarke. She lived near Hodgeville, became a nurse, and married Dr. Clarke in Hodgeville. After they moved to Vancouver, she nursed in the Children's Hospital. While there, she made up this song to sing to her little patients. "There's a Bluebird on my Windowsill" was picked up by the March of Dimes and used as their theme song. Elizabeth received royalties from the song and donated them to the Children's Hospital. Her story is one of those proudly displayed in the Heritage Museum at Hodgeville.

See also 

 List of communities in Saskatchewan
 Villages of Saskatchewan

References

Villages in Saskatchewan
Lawtonia No. 135, Saskatchewan
Division No. 7, Saskatchewan